Franey Mountain is located in Victoria County, in the Canadian province of Nova Scotia, within Cape Breton Highlands National Park. It is the highpoint of the massif between Dundas Brook and Clyburn Brook.

Hiking
The mountain can be accessed by a hiking trail which leads to the summit, offering  views over the open ocean from Cape Smokey in the east to Money Point in the north, with the Middle Head Peninsula jutting out into the Atlantic directly below. The highpoint of the mountain can be difficult to locate as the summit is broad and flat.

References

External links
Franey Mountain (with map and photos)
Cape Breton Highlands National Park of Canada, Hiking - Trail Descriptions
Trails Nova Scotia - Trail Map
Peakbagger.com - Franey Mountain, Nova Scotia

Mountains of Nova Scotia
Landforms of Victoria County, Nova Scotia
Mountains of Canada under 1000 metres